John Marley (born Mortimer Marlieb, October 17, 1907 – May 22, 1984)  was an American actor who was known for his role as Phil Cavalleri in Love Story and as Jack Woltz—the defiant film mogul who awakens to find the severed head of his prized horse in his bed—in The Godfather (1972). He starred in John Cassavetes' feature Faces (1968) and appeared in The Glitter Dome (1984).

Early years
Marley was born in Harlem in New York City to Russian-Jewish parents. He dropped out of the City College of New York, turning to a career in acting.

Career

Military service
Marley served in the United States Army Signal Corps during World War II.

Film and television
Marley was a prolific actor, appearing in nearly 250 films and television series during a career spanning over 45 years. he had roles in TV series that included The Web, Peter Gunn, Johnny Staccato, Bourbon Street Beat, Perry Mason, Rawhide, The Untouchables, Sea Hunt, 77 Sunset Strip, The Lloyd Bridges Show, Dr. Kildare, The Outer Limits, The Alfred Hitchcock Hour, The Twilight Zone, Gunsmoke, The Wild Wild West, Mannix, Bonanza, Ironside, The Name of the Game, The F.B.I., Cannon, McCloud, Kolchak: The Night Stalker, Baretta, Barnaby Jones, and Hawaii Five-0.

He was cast as George Campbell in the 1961 episode "Jerkwater" of the series The Rebel, starring Nick Adams. 

In 1962 he played the role of murderer Matthew Owen in the Perry Mason episode "The Case of the Angry Astronaut." He also showed his acting prowess in a supporting but important role of Charlie Rondell in an episode of The Virginian (1968), titled "The Crooked Path." 

Marley also played in two other movies where he attained notoriety. One was the cult movie The Car, where he played a sheriff of a small town that was victimized by a mysterious, black automobile. 

The second movie was titled Framed, where he played mob boss Sal Viccarone, who befriended a gambler while they were both in prison. 

One of Marley's more notable roles, albeit short, was that of film producer Jack Woltz in The Godfather. Marley later spoofed that role in an episode of SCTV Network. He played Max Berns, a film producer who was a caring father figure to Burt Reynolds in the stuntman tribute Hooper.

In the late 1970s, he appeared in the third season of the popular television series The Incredible Hulk as D.W. Banner, the father of David Banne in the episode titled "Homecoming".

Stage
Marley's Broadway credits include The Investigation (1966), Sing Till Tomorrow (1953), The Strong Are Lonely (1953), Skipper Next to God (1947), and Johnny Doodle (1942). Elsewhere on stage, Marley appeared in the world premiere production of Edna St. Vincent Millay's poetry drama, Conversation At Midnight in 1961 in Los Angeles, in an ensemble cast which included James Coburn, Jack Albertson and Eduard Franz. The production was directed by Robert Gist and produced by Worley Thorne and Susan Davis.

He also directed Little Theater productions in several cities.

Personal life
Marley was twice married. He and his first wife, the actress Stanja Lowe, had  three children.

Death
In 1984, Marley died at age 76 following open-heart surgery. He is interred at Cedar Park Cemetery in Emerson, New Jersey.

Recognition
In 1968, Marley won the Volpi Cup for Best Actor at the Venice Film Festival for his work in Faces. In 1970, he was nominated for an Academy Award as Best Actor in a Supporting Role for his role in Love Story, and He was nominated for a 1971 Golden Globe Award for Best Performance by an Actor in a Supporting role in Any Motion Picture for Love Story.

Filmography

References

External links

 
 
 
 
 
 

1907 births
1984 deaths
20th-century American male actors
American male film actors
American male television actors
American people of Russian-Jewish descent
Burials at Cedar Park Cemetery (Emerson, New Jersey)
City College of New York alumni
Male actors from Los Angeles
Male actors from New York City
People from Harlem
Volpi Cup for Best Actor winners